Doug Jolley (born January 2, 1979) is a former American football tight end in the National Football League. He was drafted by the Oakland Raiders in 2002, where he played three years. He would also play single seasons for the NY Jets and Tampa Bay Buccaneers.

Career
Jolley attended Brigham Young University, where he was a first-team All-Mountain West selection in 2001.

He was selected by the Oakland Raiders in the second round of the 2002 NFL Draft, and was a starter on the Raiders' Super Bowl team that year. He caught a touchdown pass in the AFC Championship Game, and hauled five more catches in the Super Bowl. He was the first St. George native ever to start a Super Bowl game.

In 2005, Jolley was dealt from the Raiders to the Jets, with a 2nd round pick and two 6th round picks, for a 1st and 7th round pick.  After a year in New York, he was traded from the Jets to Tampa Bay for a sixth round draft pick.

Personal life
Jolley played high school football at Dixie High School in St. George. His father, Gordon Jolley, played for the Detroit Lions and the Seattle Seahawks. 

Jolley is married to author Mary Beesley, with whom he has four children, Luke, Rachel, Henry and Hazel. He is also the brother-in-law of former Buffalo Bills defensive end Ryan Denney, a friend with whom he played football with at BYU, their wives are sisters.
While pursuing a masters degree in economics in 2015 at Stanford, he volunteered as a coach for their Cardinal Football team. Since leaving the NFL, Jolley has taught mathematics in various schools throughout Utah, Arizona, and Texas. After moving back to St. George, He is now teaching the same at Dixie High School

External links 
BYU Stats & Bio
Raiders Stats & Bio
Stanford Bio

Story of Relationship with friend Ryan Denney, and his wife

References

1979 births
Living people
People from St. George, Utah
American football tight ends
BYU Cougars football players
Oakland Raiders players
New York Jets players
Tampa Bay Buccaneers players
People from Sandy, Utah
Stanford University alumni
Players of American football from Utah